Below is a list of missiles, sorted alphabetically into large categories and subcategories by name and purpose.

Other missile lists
Types of missiles:
 Conventional guided missiles
 Air-to-air missile
 Air-to-surface missile
 Anti-radiation missile
 Anti-ballistic missile
 Anti-satellite weapon
 Anti-ship missile (list)
 Anti-submarine missile
 Anti-tank guided missile (list)
 Land-attack missile
 Shoulder-launched missiles
 Surface-to-air missile (list)
 Surface-to-surface missile
 Wire-guided missile
 Cruise missiles
 Air-launched cruise missile
 Ground-launched cruise missile
 Submarine-launched cruise missile
 Ballistic missiles
 Tactical ballistic missile
 Short-range ballistic missile
 Theatre ballistic missile
 Medium-range ballistic missile
 Intermediate-range ballistic missile
 Intercontinental ballistic missile (List of ICBMs/Comparison of ICBMs)
 Submarine-launched ballistic missile
 Air-launched ballistic missile

Missiles by name

A
A3SM (Mistral missile) submarine mast VSHORAD system
A3SM (MICA missile) SLAM
A-3
A-4
A-9
AA-1 Alkali (NATO reporting name for the Kaliningrad K-5)
AA-2 Atoll (NATO reporting name for the Vympel K-13)
AA-3 Anab (NATO reporting name for the Kaliningrad K-8)
AA-4 Awl (NATO reporting name for the Raduga K-9)
AA-5 Ash (NATO reporting name for the Raduga K-80)
AA-6 Acrid (NATO reporting name for the Kaliningrad K-40)
AA-7 Apex (NATO reporting name for the Kaliningrad K-23)
AA-8 Aphid (NATO reporting name for the Kaliningrad K-60)
AA-9 Amos (NATO reporting name for the Vympel R-33)
AA-10 Alamo (NATO reporting name for the Vympel R-27)
AA-11 Archer (NATO reporting name for the Vympel R-73)
AA-12 Adder (NATO reporting name for the Vympel R-77)
AA-13 Arrow (NATO reporting name for the Vympel R-37)
AAM-3 (Japanese Type 90 air-to-air missile)
AAM-4 (Japanese Type 99 air-to-air missile)
AAM-5 (Japanese Type 04 air-to-air missile)
AAM-N-4 Oriole
AASM
Abdali-I (Pakistani surface-to-surface Short-range ballistic missile)
ABM-1 Galosh (NATO reporting name for the Russian/USSR, Vympel A-350 surface-to-air Anti-Ballistic Missile)
ABM-3 Gazelle (NATO reporting name for the Russian/USSR A-135 surface-to-air Anti-Ballistic Missile)
A-Darter
ADATS (Swiss-American)
ADM-20 Quail
ADM-141 TALD
ADM-144
ADM-160 MALD
AGM-12 Bullpup
AGM-22
AGM-28 Hound Dog
AGM-45 Shrike
AGM-48 Skybolt
AGM-53 Condor
AGM-62 Walleye
AGM-63
AGM-64 Hornet
AGM-65 Maverick
AGM-69 SRAM
AGM-76 Falcon
AGM-78 Standard ARM
AGM-79 Blue Eye
AGM-80 Viper
AGM-83 Bulldog
AGM-84 Harpoon
AGM-84E SLAM
AGM-84H/K SLAM-ER
AGM-86 ALCM
AGM-87 Focus
AGM-88 HARM
AGM-112
AGM-114 Hellfire
AGM-119 Penguin (Norwegian-made; only non-US-made missile in US arsenal)
AGM-122 Sidearm
AGM-123 Skipper
AGM-124 Wasp
AGM-129 ACM
AGM-130
AGM-131 SRAM II
AGM-136 Tacit Rainbow
AGM-137 TSSAM
AGM-142 Have Nap US codename for imported Popeye missiles
AGM-153
AGM-154 JSOW
AGM-158 JASSM
AGM-159 JASSM
AGM-169 Joint Common Missile
AGM-179 JAGM
AGM-183A ARRW
Agni I (India)
Agni II (India)
Agni III (India)
Agni IV (India)
Agni V (India)
Agni VI (India)
Agni-P (India)
AIM-4 Falcon
AIM-7 Sparrow
AIM-9 Sidewinder
AIM-26 Falcon
AIM-47 Falcon
AIM-54 Phoenix
AIM-68 Big Q
AIM-82
AIM-97 Seekbat
AIM-95 Agile
AIM-120 AMRAAM
AIM-132 ASRAAM
AIM-152 AAAM
AIR-2 Genie
Air-Sol Moyenne Portée (ASMP)
Akash (India)
Akash-NG
Alacrán (Spanish for "Scorpion")
ALARM
ALAS
Al-Hussein
Al-Samoud 2
ANL (Franco-British)
Anza
Apache
Arrow (Israeli missile) (Anti-ballistic)
AS-25K (anti-ship)
AS-20
AS-30
AS.34 Kormoran
ASM-1 (Japanese Type 80 air-to-ship missile)
ASM-2 (Japanese Type 93 air-to-ship missile)
ASM-135 ASAT
ASMP
Aspide
ASRAAM (project name for the AIM-132 ASRAAM)
ASGLA (Igla missile) (Germano-Ukrainian) land-based VSHORAD system
ASRAD (Stinger, RBS-70 mk2, Igla, Mistral, Starburst missiles) land-based VSHORAD system
ASRAD-2 land-based VSHORAD system
ASRAD-R (Bolide missile) (Germano-Swedish) land-based VSHORAD system
ASRAD-R Naval (Bolide missile) (Germano-Swedish) shipboard VSHORAD system
Aster
Astra(BVR Mk I)(INDIAN)
Astra (BVR MK II)(INDIAN)
Astra(BVR MK III)(INDIAN)
Astra(IR)(INDIAN)
ATAKA 9M120 (Russian anti-tank missile)
ATILGAN PMSS naval/land-based VSHORAD system
ATM-1 (Japanese Type 64 Anti-Tank Missile)
ATM-2 (Japanese Type 79 Anti-Landing craft and Anti-Tank Missile)
ATM-3 (Japanese Type 87 Anti-Tank Missile)
ATM-4 (Japanese Type 96 Multi-Purpose Missile System)
ATM-5 (Japanese Type 01 Light Anti-Tank Missile)
AUM-N-2 Petrel

B
Babur (Pakistani Cruise Missile)
BAC Vigilant
Bantam
Barak 1 naval point defense surface-to-air missile (Israel)
Barak 8 naval area defense surface-to-air missile (Israel-India)
BGM-34 Firebee
BGM-71 TOW
BGM-75 AICBM
BGM-109 Tomahawk
BGM-110
Baktar-Shikan (Pakistani Anti-tank Guided Missile)
Black Arrow (United Kingdom)
Bloodhound  UK Surface-to-air
Blowfish submarine mast VSHORAD system
Blowpipe  UK Man portable Surface-to-air
Blue Steel nuclear stand off missile (United Kingdom)
Blue Streak (United Kingdom)
Bofors Bantam
Bölkow Bö 810 Cobra
BrahMos (India-Russia; World's fastest cruise missile)
Brakemine  UK WWII project
Brimstone (United Kingdom)

C

C-602
C-701
C-802
CA-94
CA-95
CGM-16 Atlas
CGM-121B Seek Spinner
CIM-10 Bomarc
Roketsan Cirit (Turkey)
Cobra
Cobra (Germano-Swiss)
Cobra 2000 (Germano-Swiss)
Condor (Argentina)
Crotale (France)

D

Desna (popular name for the R-9 Desna intercontinental ballistic missile)
Dnipro
Dongfeng 1 (SS-2) (DF-1)
Dongfeng 2 (CSS-1) (DF-2)
Dongfeng 3 (CSS-2) (DF-3)
Dongfeng 4 (CSS-3) (DF-4)
Dongfeng 5 (CSS-4) (DF-5)
Dongfeng 11 (CSS-7) (DF-11)
Dongfeng 12 (CSS-X-15)(DF-12) 
Dongfeng 15 (CSS-6) (DF-15)
Dongfeng 16 (DF-16)
Dongfeng 21 (CSS-5) (DF-21)
Dongfeng 25 (DF-25)
Dongfeng 31 (CSS-10) (DF-31)
Dongfeng 41 (CSS-X-10) (DF-41)
Dvina (popular name for the R-12 Dvina theatre ballistic missile)

E

EGBU-15
Elbrus (popular name for the R-300, a Scud variant)
Emad
Enforcer
ENTAC (France)
Enzian
Eryx (France)
Euromissile HOT anti-armour missile
EuroSpike (Germano-Israeli)
Exocet (popular name for the MBDA Exocet)

F

Fateh-110
Fireflash
Firestreak
FGM-77 MAW
FGM-148 Javelin
FGM-172 SRAW
Fieseler Fi 103, the V-1
FIM-43 Redeye
FIM-92 Stinger
FROG-7

G

Gabriel (Ship-to-ship and air-to-ship variant)
GAF Malkara
Ghauri-I (Pakistani)
Ghauri-II (Pakistani)
Ghauri-III 
Global Rocket 1 fractional orbital bombardment system missile (Russia; Cold War) (NATO reporting name SS-X-10 Scrag)
Gorodomlya G-1 - Developed by a German team at Gorodomlya island (57°12'0.06"N, 33° 4'0.02"E) in 1948, based on the V-2 with detachable warhead and integral propellant tanks. (a.k.a. R-10).
Gorodomlya G-1M - The G-1 with a more powerful engine proposed in 1949.
Gorodomlya G-2 - (a.k.a. R-12) Developed as far as preliminary design the G-2 first stage was to have been powered by a cluster of three engines from the G-1 with a thrust of approx 100tons, the second stage being capable of delivering the warhead 2,000 to 2,500 kilometres. Insurmountable problems with control of the second stage forced abandonment.
Gorodomlya G-3 - The G-3 project was to have been a two-stage, G-1 derived rocket, with a winged upper stage similar to the A9 developed by Wernher Von Braun's team at Peenemünde, for a projected range of 8,000 to 10,000 kilometres
Gorodomlya G-4 - In April 1949 the Gorodomlya group were given the same requirements as the team at NII-88 (which produced the R-3). The German group designed a 24m (78 ft 9in) tall cone shaped rocket with an empty weight (including a three-ton warhead) of seven tons and a launch weight of 70.85 tons, (a.k.a. R-14).
Gorodomlya G-5 - Designed in parallel with the G-4, (a.k.a. R-15), another group at Gorodomlya proposed a ramjet powered unmanned bomber boosted by a G-1 or A4 rocket, cruising at  altitude for a range of 3,000 kilometres.
Green Cheese (missile)
Green Flash (missile)
AGM-176 Griffin
Grom

H

Hadès
Harpoon
Hatf-I
Hatf-IA
Hatf-IB
Hatf-VA
Hatf-VIII
Hatf-VIII (Ra'ad)
HGM-16 Atlas
Hongqi-1 SAM
Hongqi-2 SAM
Hongying-5 SAM
Hongqi-7 SAM
Hongqi-9 SAM
Hongqi-10 SAM
Hongqi-15 SAM
Hongqi-17 SAM
Hongqi-18 SAM
Hongqi-61 SAM
HOT (popular name for the Euromissile HOT anti-armour missile)
Hrim-2
Hsiung Feng I (HF-1) (ship-to-ship)
Hsiung Feng II (HF-2) (guided multiplatform antiship)
Hsiung Feng IIE (HF-2E) (land attack cruise missile variant of HF-2)
Hsiung Feng III (HF-3) (anti-ship cruise missile)
Hyunmoo

I

IDAS
Ingwe
IRIS-T

J

J-Missile
Javelin   Surface-to-air
Jericho missile (Ground-to-ground ballistic)
JL-1
JL-2

K
K-4 (SLBM) (India)
K-5 (SLBM) (India)
K-15 (SLBM) (India)
Kaliningrad K-5 (AA-1 Alkali)
Kaliningrad K-8 (AA-3 Anab)
KAN Little Joe
Raduga K-9 (AA-4 Awl)
Vympel K-13 (AA-2 Atoll)
Kaishan-1 SAM
Khalij Fars ASBM
KN-08
KN-11

L

LAM (Loitering Attack Missile)
LEM-70 Minuteman ERCS
LFK NG
LGM-25 Titan
LGM-30 Minuteman
Minuteman I
Minuteman II
Minuteman III
LGM-35 Sentinel
LGM-118 Peacekeeper
Lieying-60 SAM
LIM-49 Spartan
LIM-99
LIM-100
Little Joe (shipborne surface-to-air)
Long March cruise missile

M

M1 SLBM (France) submarine-launched ballistic missile
M2 SLBM (France)
M4 SLBM (France)
M5 SLBM (France)
M20 SLBM (France)
M45 SLBM (France)
M51 SLBM (France)
Magic (popular name for the R550 Magic)
Mectron MAA-1 Piranha (short-range air-air infrared homing missile)
Malkara (joint Australian/British)
Mamba (Germano-Swiss)
MAN-1 (anti-ship missile by Mectron, not in service yet)
Martin Pescador MP-1000 anti-ship ASM (Argentina)
MAR-1 (anti-radiation missile by Mectron, in tests)
Mathogo anti-tank, wire-guided (Argentina)
MBB Cobra
MBDA Apache
MBDA AS-30
MBDA Aster
MBDA Exocet
MBDA Meteor
MBDA Scalp EG
MGM-1 Matador
MGM-5 Corporal
MGM-13 Mace
MGM-18 Lacrosse
MGM-21
MGM-29 Sergeant
MGM-31 Pershing
MGM-32 ENTAC
MGM-51 Shillelagh
MGM-52 Lance
MGM-140 ATACMS
MGM-134 Midgetman
MGM-157 EFOGM
MGM-164 ATACMS II
MGM-166 LOSAT
MGM-168 ATACMS Block IVA
MGR-1 Honest John
 MHT/MLP
MICA (project name for the MBDA MICA)
MILAN
MIM-3 Nike-Ajax
MIM-14 Nike-Hercules
MIM-23 Hawk
MIM-46 Mauler
MIM-72 Chaparral
MIM-104 Patriot
MIM-115 Roland
MIM-146 ADATS
Miniature Hit-to-Kill Missile
MISTRAL
MMP (anti-tank)
MMP/SEA LAUNCHED (ship-to-ship/shore)
Mokopa
Molodets (popular name for the RT-23 Molodets)
Mosquito (Germano-Swiss)
MR-UR-100 Sotka intercontinental ballistic missile (Russia; Cold War) (NATO reporting name SS-17 Spanker)
 MX: See LGM-118 Peacekeeper

N

Nag (Indian Anti-Tank Guided Missile)
Nirbhay (India)
Naval Strike Missile (NSM)
Neptune
Nike
Nodong-1
Nord 5203 surface-to-surface missile (SS.10) (France)
Nord 5210 surface-to-surface / air-to-surface missile (SS.11) (France)
Nord SS.10 surface-to-surface missile (France)
Nord SS.11 surface-to-surface / air-to-surface missile (France)
Nord SS.12 surface-to-surface missile (France)
Nulka (Australia)

O

 Oka (popular name for the R-400 Oka)
 Otomat

P

P-1 (SS-N-1 Scrubber)
P-700 Granit (SS-N-19 Shipwreck)
PAAMS (MBDA Aster missile) (Franco-British-Italian) shipboard SHORAD/MRAD system
PAD
PARS 3 LR
Penguin (U.S. designation: AGM-119)
Pershing II Weapon System
PL-9 SAM (PenLung)
PL-10 (PenLung)
Polyphem
PGM-11 Redstone
PGM-17 Thor
PGM-19 Jupiter
RT-21M Pioner (popular name for the RT-21M Pioner)
Pluton
PMADS naval/land-based VSHORAD system
Popeye (Standoff. U.S. designation AGM-142 Have Nap. A cruise missile variant purportedly exists as well)
Prahaar
Prithvi (India)
Prithvi II (India)
Prithvi III (India)
Pye Python
Python 5 (popular name for Rafael Python 5)

Q

Qassam rocket
Qiam 1 surface-to-surface missile (Iran)
QRSAM quick reaction SAM (India)
QW-1 SAM
QW-2 SAM

R

 R-1 theatre ballistic missile (SS-1 Scunner)
 R-2 theatre ballistic missile (SS-2 Sibling)
R-4 missile (AA-5 Ash)
 R-5 theatre ballistic missile (SS-3 Shyster)
 R-7 Semyorka intercontinental ballistic missile (USSR/Russia; Cold War) (NATO name SS-6 Sapwood)
 R-9 Desna intercontinental ballistic missile (USSR/Russia; Cold War) (NATO name SS-8 Sasin)
 R-11 Zemlya tactical ballistic missile (USSR; Cold War) (NATO name SS-1b Scud)
 R-12 Dvina theatre ballistic missile (USSR; Cold War) (NATO name SS-4 Sandal)
 R-13 submarine-launched ballistic missile (USSR; Cold War) (SS-N-4 Sark)
 R-14 Chusovaya theatre ballistic missile (USSR; Cold War) (NATO name SS-5 Skean)
 R-15 submarine ballistic missile (USSR; Cold War)
 R-16 intercontinental ballistic missile (USSR; Cold War) (NATO name SS-7 Saddler)
 R-17E, variant of Russian Scud B
 R-21 submarine-launched ballistic missile (USSR; Cold War) (SS-N-5 Serb)
R-23 (AA-7 Apex)
 R-26 intercontinental ballistic missile (USSR; Cold War) (mistakenly applied NATO name SS-8 Sasin)
 R-27 submarine-launched ballistic missile (USSR; Cold War) (SS-N-6 Serb)
R-27 (AA-10 Alamo)
R-33 (AA-9 Amos)
 R-36 intercontinental ballistic missile (USSR/Ukraine) (NATO name SS-9 Scarp and SS-18 Satan)
R-39 missile (SS-N-20 Sturgeon)
R-40 (AA-6 Acrid)
 R-46 orbital launcher and intercontinental ballistic missile (Russia; Cold War)
R-60 (AA-8 Aphid)
R-73 (AA-11 Archer)
R-77 (AA-12 Adder)
 R-300 Elbrus theatre ballistic missile (USSR; Cold War) (NATO name SS-1c Scud)
 R-400 Oka theatre ballistic missile (USSR; Cold War) (NATO name SS-23 Spider)
R550 Magic
Ra'ad Hataf VIII (Pakistani Cruise Missile)
Rapier     Surface-to-air
Rafael Python 5 (Air-to-air)
RBS-15
RBS-23
RBS-70
RBS-77
RBS-90
Red Top   Air-to-air
RGM-6 Regulus
RGM-15 Regulus II
RGM-59 Taurus
RGM-165 LASM
RIM-2 Terrier
RIM-7 Sea Sparrow
RIM-8 Talos
RIM-24 Tartar
RIM-50 Typhon LR
RIM-55 Typhon MR
RIM-66 Standard Missile-1
RIM-66 Standard Missile-2
RIM-67 Standard Missile-1 ER
RIM-67 Standard Missile-2 ER
RIM-85
RIM-101
RIM-113
RIM-116 Rolling Airframe Missile
RIM-156 Standard Missile-2ER Block IV
RIM-161 Standard Missile-3
RIM-162 ESSM
ROLAND air defence missile
 RS-24 intercontinental ballistic missile (Russia; Modern)
RSA
RSA-1 mobile missile
RSA-2 IRBM
RSA-3 IRBM & SLV
RSA-4 ICBM & SLV
RSC-54
RSC-56
RSC-57
RSC/RSD 58
RSE Kriens
RT-1 theatre ballistic missile (USSR; Cold War)
RT-2 intercontinental ballistic missile (Russia; Cold War) (SS-13 Savage)
RT-2PM Topol intercontinental ballistic missile (Russia; Modern)(SS-25 Sickle)
RT-2UTTH Topol M intercontinental ballistic missile (Russia; Modern) (SS-27)
RT-15 mobile land launched theatre ballistic missile (USSR; Cold War) (SS-14 Scamp)
RT-20 intercontinental ballistic missile (USSR; Cold War) (SS-15 Scrooge)
RT-21 Temp 2S intercontinental ballistic missile (USSR; Cold War) (SS-16 Sinner)
RT-21M Pioner theatre ballistic missile (USSR; Cold War) (SS-20 Saber)
RT-23 Molodets intercontinental ballistic missile (Russia; Modern) (SS-24 Scalpel)
RT-25 theatre ballistic missile (USSR; Cold War)
Rudram-1 Indian Air launched Anti-radiation missile also known as NGARM
RUM-139 VL-Asroc
RUR-5 Asroc

S
S1 IRBM
S2 IRBM
S3 IRBM
SA-2 Guideline
SA-3 Goa
SA-4 Ganef
SA-5 Gammon
SA-6 Gainful
SA-7 Grail
SA-8 Gecko
SA-9 Gaskin
SA-10 Grumble
SA-11 Gadfly
SA-12 Gladiator/Giant
SA-13 Gopher
SA-14 Gremlin
SA-15 Gauntlet
SA-16 Gimlet
SA-17 Grizzly
SA-18 Grouse
SA-19 Grisom
SA-20 Gargoyle
SA-X-21 Growler
SA-N-3 Goblet
SA-N-5 Grail
Saber (SS-20) (NATO reporting name for the RT-21M Pioner)
Saddler (SS-7) (NATO reporting name for the R-16 rocket)
Samid
Saegheh
Sagarika (SLBM) (Indian ballistic missile)
SAMP/T (MBDA Aster missile) (Franco-Italian) land-based SHORAD/MRAD system
Sejjil (MRBM) (Iranian ballistic missile)
Sandal (SS-4) (NATO reporting name for the R-12 Dvina)
Sapsan
Sapwood (SS-6) (NATO reporting name for the R-7 Semyorka)
Sark (SS-N-4) (NATO reporting name for the R-13)
Sasin (SS-8) (NATO reporting name for the R-9 Desna, also mistakenly applied to the R-26)
Satan (SS-18) (NATO reporting name for the R-36M)
Savage (SS-13) (NATO reporting name for the RT-2)
Scaleboard (SS-12 / SS-22) (NATO reporting name for the TR-1 Temp)
SCALP EG (Franco-British)
Scalpel (SS-24) (NATO reporting name for the RT-23 Molodets)
Scamp (SS-14) (NATO reporting name for the RT-15)
Scapegoat (SS-14) (alternate NATO reporting name for the RT-15)
Scarp (SS-9) (NATO reporting name for the R-36)
Scrag (SS-X-10) (NATO reporting name for the Global Rocket 1 and UR-200)
Scrooge (SS-15) (NATO reporting name for the RT-20)
Scud (SS-1b/SS-1c) (NATO reporting name for the R-11 Zemlya and R-300 Elbrus family)
Scunner (SS-1) (NATO reporting name for the R-1)
SD-10 (Pakistani beyond visual range air-to-air missile)
Sea Cat
Sea Dart
Sea Eagle
Sea Skua
Sea Slug   Surface-to-air
Sea Venom (Franco-British)
Sea Viper (MBDA Aster missile) (Franco-British-Italian) shipboard SHORAD/MRAD system
Sea Wolf   Surface-to-air
Sego (SS-11) (NATO reporting name for the UR-100)
Semyorka (popular name for the R-7 Semyorka)
Serb (SS-N-5) (NATO reporting name for the R-21)
Serb (SS-N-6) (NATO reporting name for the R-27)
Shahab-1
Shahab-2
Shahab-3
Shahab-3D
Shahab-4
Shahab-5
Shahab-6
Shaheen-I (Pakistani MRBM)
Shaheen-II (Pakistani IRBM)
Shaheen-III (Pakistani IRBM)
Shavit (Space launcher)
Shkval (VA-111)
Shaurya (India)
Shyster (SS-3) (NATO reporting name for the R-5)
Sibling (SS-2) (NATO reporting name for the R-2)
Sickle (SS-25) (NATO reporting name for the RT-2PM Topol)
Silkworm subsonic cruise missile
Sinner (SS-16) (NATO reporting name for the RT-21 Temp 2S)
Skean (SS-5) (NATO reporting name for the R-14 Chusovaya)
Sky Bow I (TK-1) (SAM)
Sky Bow II (TK-2) (SAM)
Sky Bow III (TK-3) (SAM)
Sky Spear (Short range SSBM)
Sky Sword I (TC-1) (air-to-air)
Sky Sword II (TC-2) (air-to-air)
Skybolt ALBM
SLAM
SLAM-ER
SM-62 Snark
SM-73 Goose (decoy cruise missile)
SM-74 (proposed decoy cruise missile)
Sotka (popular name for the MR-UR-100 Sotka)
Spanker (SS-17) (NATO reporting name for the MR-UR-100 Sotka)
Spartan LIM-49A ABM
Spider (SS-23) (NATO reporting name for the R-400 Oka)
Spike/Gil (Anti-tank)
Sprint ABM
SS-1 Scunner (NATO reporting name for the R-1)
SS-1b Scud (NATO reporting name for the R-11 Zemlya)
SS-1c Scud (NATO reporting name for the R-300 Elbrus)
SS-2 Sibling (NATO reporting name for the R-2)
SS-3 Shyster (NATO reporting name for the R-5)
SS-4 Sandal (NATO reporting name for the R-12 Dvina)
SS-5 Skean (NATO reporting name for the R-14 Chusovaya)
SS-6 Sapwood (NATO reporting name for the R-7 Semyorka)
SS-7 Saddler (NATO reporting name for the R-16 rocket)
SS-8 Sasin (NATO reporting name for the R-9 Desna, also mistakenly applied to the R-26)
SS-9 Scarp (NATO reporting name for the R-36)
SS.10 surface-to-surface missile (France)
SS.11 surface-to-surface / air-to-surface missile (France)
SS.12 surface-to-surface missile (France)
SS-11 Sego (NATO reporting name for the UR-100)
SS-12 surface-to-surface missile (France)
SS-12 Scaleboard (NATO reporting name for the TR-1 Temp)
SS-13 Savage (NATO reporting name for the RT-2)
SS-14 Scamp (NATO reporting name for the RT-15)
SS-15 Scrooge (NATO reporting name for the RT-20)
SS-16 Sinner (NATO reporting name for the RT-21 Temp 2S)
SS-17 Spanker (NATO reporting name for the MR-UR-100)
SS-18 Satan (NATO reporting name for the R-36M)
SS-19 Stiletto (NATO reporting name for the UR-100N)
SS-20 Saber (NATO reporting name for the RT-21M)
SS-21 Scarab (NATO reporting name for the OTR-21)
SS-22 Scaleboard (NATO reporting name for the TR-1 Temp modified versions)
SS-23 Spider (NATO reporting name for the R-400 Oka)
SS-24 Scalpel (NATO reporting name for the RT-23 Molodets)
SS-25 Sickle (NATO reporting name for the RT-2PM Topol)
SS-27 (NATO reporting name for the RT-2UTTH Topol M)
SS-1000 (Brazil, retired)
SSM-N-2 Triton (never built)
SS-N-2 Styx
SS-N-4 Sark (NATO reporting name for the R-13)
SS-N-5 Serb (NATO reporting name for the R-21)
SS-N-6 Serb (NATO reporting name for the R-27)
SS-N-12 Sandbox
SS-N-15 Starfish
SS-N-16 Stallion
SS-N-17
SS-N-19 Shipwreck
SS-N-20
SS-N-22 Sunburn
SS-N-27 Sizzler (NATO reporting name for the 3M-54 Klub)
SS-X-10 Scrag (NATO reporting name for the Global Rocket 1 and UR-200)
SSM-A-23 Dart
Standoff Land Attack Missile
Starstreak
Storm Shadow
Strela-1 (SA-9 Gaskin)
Strela-2 (SA-7/SA-N-5 Grail)
Super 530 
Swingfire

T

Taimur (Pakistani ICBM)
Taurus
THAAD
Terne ASW
Temp (popular name for the TR-1 Temp)
Temp 2S (popular name for the RT-21 Temp 2S)
Thunderbird (surface-to-air missile for British Army use, built by English Electric)
Tippu (Pakistani IRBM)
TLVS (PAC-3 MSE, IRIS-T SL missiles) (Germano-American) land-based SHORAD/MRAD system
Topol (popular name for the RT-2PM Topol and RT-2UTTH Topol M)
TOROS
TR-1 Temp theatre ballistic missile (Russia; Cold War) (SS-12 / SS-22 Scaleboard)
Trigat
Trishul (Indian Surface-to-Air Missile)

U

UGM-27 Polaris
UGM-73 Poseidon
UGM-89 Perseus
UGM-96 Trident I
UGM-133 Trident II
Umkhonto
UMTAS
 UR-100 intercontinental ballistic missile (Russia; Cold War) (NATO reporting name SS-11 Sego)
 UR-100MR (common alternate designation for the MR-UR-100 Sotka)
 UR-100N intercontinental ballistic missile (Russia; Cold War) (NATO reporting name SS-19 Stiletto)
 UR-200 intercontinental ballistic missile (Russia; Cold War) (NATO reporting name SS-X-10 Scrag)
 Chusovaya (popular name for the R-14 Chusovaya)
UUM-44 Subroc
UUM-125 Sea Lance

V

V-1
V-2
Vilkha
Voivode (popular name for the R-36M2)
VL-SRSAM (Indian naval surface-to-air missile derived from Astra

W

Wasserfall

X

X-4

Y

Yun Feng

Z

 Zircon

See also 
 Comparison of orbital launch systems
 Lists of weapons
 List of missiles by country
 List of active missiles of the United States military
 List of orbital launch systems
 List of rocket aircraft
 List of sounding rockets
 List of military rockets
 List of upper stages
 List of artillery#Rockets
 Model rocket
 Intercontinental ballistic missile
 Expendable launch system
 NATO reporting name (has lists of various Soviet missiles)

References

External links 
 Missile Threat CSIS - Missiles of the World
 Federation of American Scientists (FAS) Missile directory
 Missile.index – Based on Shinkigensha Co.Ltd's "Illustrated Encyclopedia of the World's Missile Systems"; ill. by Hitoshi Kitamura
 Directory of U.S. Military Rockets and Missiles – By Andreas Parsch
 Meaning of the code letters
 Indian Missiles

Missiles